Rubén Ramírez (born 17 October 1982 in Margarita, Santa Fe) is an Argentine football striker who plays for Temperley.

Career
Ramírez started playing in the youth team of Colón. He was loaned to Tiro Federal for the 2004–2005 season, returning to Colón in 2005. He has established himself as a regular member of the first team squad.

In February 2009, he joined Racing Club but after less than a year he moved on to join Club Atlético Banfield.

Ramírez scored his first goal in Banfield with a goal in a 3-0 win versus Argentinos Juniors on 24 February 2010. Two further goals followed in a 3-1 win over Colón de Santa Fe, one of Ramirez former clubs, on 4 March 2010. Two more important goals came in a home match against Gimnasia y Esgrima de la Plata on 27 March 2010, after Gimnasia had taken the lead and missed a penalty, Ramírez scored twice in the second half to help Banfield win 3-2. On 21 April 2010, Ruben added two more headed goals to his Copa Libertadores season in a 4-1 home win over Deportivo Cuenca.

On 14 May 2010, Ruben scored the third goal in a 3-0 win over Boca Juniors. He was the top scorer of 2011 Apertura, with 12 goals.

On 31 July 2012, he signed for Colón de Santa Fe for second time in his career.

References

External links
  Argentine Primera statistics
 Football-Lineups player profile
 

1982 births
Living people
People from Vera Department
Argentine footballers
Association football forwards
Tiro Federal footballers
Club Atlético Colón footballers
Racing Club de Avellaneda footballers
Club Atlético Banfield footballers
Godoy Cruz Antonio Tomba footballers
Audax Italiano footballers
Chilean Primera División players
Argentine Primera División players
Expatriate footballers in Chile
Sportspeople from Santa Fe Province